Trinity High School is a Roman Catholic secondary school in Renfrew, Scotland.

The school's building was originally the site of the state school Renfrew High, but in 1975 Renfrew High School moved to a new larger site, and the building became Trinity High School. 

Over the years an ICT block and an extension have been built. The extension now houses the Religious Education department, Home Economics department and the Modern Languages department. It’s bright orange and needs to be repainted.

The school's pastoral system is organised into four houses. They are: St Therese House, St Andrew's House, St Columba's House and St Margaret's House.

Notable alumni 
 Gavin Newlands, SNP MP for Paisley and Renfrewshire North 2015–present
 Chris Stephens, SNP MP for Glasgow South West 2015–present

References

External links
Trinity High School
Trinity High School's page on Scottish Schools Online

Catholic secondary schools in Renfrewshire
Renfrew
Erskine, Renfrewshire
1975 establishments in Scotland
Educational institutions established in 1975